Internet Society Nepal is a non-profit organization working with the main theme of "Internet is for everyone". Registered under the Registration Act of Nepal, it was formalized on 11 November 2009 at District Administration Office, Kathmandu, Nepal. Previously, ISOC Nepal was a loose network and received its status of National Chapter by the Internet Society [ISOC] in April 2007.

The ISOC Nepal was envisioned with the concept of Public-private partnership for facilitating standardization and policy issue of internet. Today it has proven to be a leading policy lobbying organization that facilitates the public and private sectors with resources and standardization issues in Nepal.

Founding Members of ISOC Nepal

Executive committee
Internet Society Nepal Chapter (ISOC-Nepal) convened its Fourth Annual General Meeting on December 14, 2013 in Kathmandu. The AGM unanimously elected a new executive committee for 2 years.

References

External links

Internet in Nepal
Internet governance organizations
Internet Standards
Organizations established in 2007